Andrew Streitwieser was an American chemist known for his contributions to physical organic chemistry.

Streitwieser was born in 1927 in Buffalo, New York and he grew up in New York City.  He attended Columbia College and then Columbia University where he earned a PhD in the research group of William von Eggers Doering in  1952. He then was a postdoctoral fellow in the laboratory of John D. Roberts at MIT.  He has been Professor of Chemistry at the University of California, Berkeley since 1953.

Streitwieser was one of the pioneers of molecular orbital theory and his book Molecular Orbital Theory for Organic Chemists had a lasting impact on the field.  He is also well-known for proposing the currently accepted interpretation of the origin of secondary deuterium kinetic isotope effects.  Streitwieser developed the technique of using protium/deuterium exchange to measure the acidity of exceedingly weak carbon acids and was a codeveloper of the MSAD acidity scale, named for the first initials of the chemists who developed it.  His Chemical Reviews article titled "Solvolytic Displacement Reactions at Saturated Carbon" was influential in the field of physical organic chemistry.  Streitwieser is also the author of the widely used university textbook Introduction to Organic Chemistry (4th revised ed., 1998, with Heathcock and Kosower, German translation, Organische Chemie), as well as the autobiography A Lifetime of Synergy With Theory and Experiment.

Streitwieser was elected to the United States National Academy of Sciences in 1969 and was an American Chemical Society Fellow.  He is the recipient of the ACS Award in Petroleum Chemistry (1967), James Flack Norris Award in Physical Organic Chemistry (1982), the Guggenheim Fellowship (1968), the Arthur C. Cope Scholar Award (1989), and the Roger Adams Award (2009).

References

1927 births
2022 deaths
21st-century American chemists
University of California, Berkeley faculty
Members of the United States National Academy of Sciences
Columbia College (New York) alumni
People from Buffalo, New York